Cenobio is an Italian language quarterly literary magazine based in Lugano, Canton Ticino, Switzerland. It is the largest literary magazine in the Italian speaking part of Switzerland.

History and profile
The magazine was founded by Pier Riccardo Frigeri in 1952. After his retirement in 2002, Manuel Rossello became the editor-in-chief until 2007, followed by Pietro Montorfani in 2008. Its current editor-in-chief is Pietro Montorfani.

Cenobio is published on a quarterly basis.

See also
List of magazines in Switzerland
List of literary magazines

References

External links
 Cenobio' home page

1952 establishments in Switzerland
Italian-language magazines
Magazines established in 1952
Mass media in Lugano
Literary magazines published in Switzerland
Quarterly magazines published in Switzerland